
Lubań County is a unit of territorial administration and local government (powiat) in Lower Silesian Voivodeship, south-western Poland. It came into being on January 1, 1999, as a result of the Polish local government reforms passed in 1998. Its administrative seat and largest town is Lubań. The county also contains the towns of Olszyna, Leśna and Świeradów-Zdrój.

As at 2006 the total population of the county is 54,493, out of which the population of Lubań is 21,087, that of Leśna is 4,439, that of Olszyna is 4,348, that of Świeradów-Zdrój is 4,147, and the rural population is 20,472.

Neighbouring counties
Lubań County is bordered by Zgorzelec County to the west, Bolesławiec County to the north-east and Lwówek Śląski County to the east. It also borders the Czech Republic to the south.

Administrative division
The county is subdivided into seven gminas (two urban, two urban-rural and three rural). These are listed in the following table, in descending order of population.

References

 
Land counties of Lower Silesian Voivodeship